Louis Wessels (born 27 August 1998) is a German tennis player. He has a career-high ATP singles ranking of world No. 267, achieved in July 2022.

Tennis career 
On the junior tour, Wessels has a career high ITF junior ranking of 17 achieved in May 2016. Wessels has reached the doubles semifinals at three of the four junior grand slams, including the 2015 Australian Open, 2015 US Open and the 2016 Wimbledon Championships.

Wessels made his ATP main draw debut at the 2016 German Open, where he upset Steven Diez in the first round. This victory made him the youngest player to win a main draw match at the 2016 ATP World Tour by that time.

ATP Challenger and ITF Futures/World Tennis Tour finals

Singles: 18 (8–10)

Doubles: 9 (5–4)
{|
|-valign=top
|

References

External links
 
 

1998 births
Living people
German male tennis players
Sportspeople from Bielefeld
People from Detmold
Sportspeople from Detmold (region)
Tennis people from North Rhine-Westphalia